Two-time defending champion Pete Sampras successfully defended his title, defeating Boris Becker in the final, 6–7(5–7), 6–2, 6–4, 6–2 to win the gentlemen's singles tennis title at the 1995 Wimbledon Championships.

This is the most recent Wimbledon where the top 4 seeds made the semi-finals.

Seeds

  Andre Agassi (semifinals)
  Pete Sampras (champion)
  Boris Becker (final)
  Goran Ivanišević (semifinals)
  Michael Chang (second round)
  Yevgeny Kafelnikov (quarterfinals)
  Wayne Ferreira (fourth round)
  Sergi Bruguera (withdrew)
  Michael Stich (first round)
  Marc Rosset (first round)
  Jim Courier (second round)
  Richard Krajicek (first round)
  Stefan Edberg (second round)
  Todd Martin (fourth round)
  Andriy Medvedev (second round)
  Guy Forget (second round)

Sergi Bruguera withdrew due to injury. He was replaced in the draw by the highest-ranked non-seeded player Thomas Enqvist. This marked a change in Wimbledon policy, as previously seeded players who withdrew from the tournament were replaced by a qualifier or lucky loser (depending on when the withdrawal occurred).

Qualifying

Draw

Finals

Top half

Section 1

Section 2

Section 3

Section 4

Bottom half

Section 5

Section 6

Section 7

Section 8

References

External links

 1995 Wimbledon Championships – Men's draws and results at the International Tennis Federation

Men's Singles
Wimbledon Championship by year – Men's singles